Eltroplectris, the long-claw orchid, is a genus of flowering plants from the orchid family, Orchidaceae. It is native to South America, the West Indies, and Florida.

Eltroplectris assumpcaoana Campacci & Kautsky - Brazil
Eltroplectris brachycentron Szlach. -Bolivia
Eltroplectris calcarata (Sw.) Garay & H.R.Sweet - Florida, Bahamas, Cayman Islands, Cuba, Hispaniola, Jamaica, Puerto Rico, Windward Islands, Trinidad, Suriname, Venezuela, Colombia, Peru, Brazil, Paraguay  
Eltroplectris cogniauxiana (Schltr.) Pabst - Brazil
Eltroplectris dalessandroi Dodson - Ecuador 
Eltroplectris janeirensis (Porto & Brade) Pabst - Brazil
Eltroplectris kuhlmanniana (Hoehne) Szlach. & Rutk. in P.Rutkowski, D.L.Szlachetko & M.Górniak - Brazil
Eltroplectris longicornu (Cogn.) Pabst - Brazil
Eltroplectris macrophylla (Schltr.) Pabst - Brazil
Eltroplectris misera (Kraenzl.) Szlach. - Brazil
Eltroplectris rossii Dodson & G.A.Romero  - Ecuador 
Eltroplectris schlechteriana (Porto & Brade) Pabst - Brazil, Argentina, Paraguay
Eltroplectris triloba (Lindl.) Pabst - Brazil, Argentina, Paraguay

See also 
 List of Orchidaceae genera

References

External links 

Cranichideae genera
Spiranthinae